Pyotr (or Petr) Andreyevich Pavlensky (born 8 March 1984) is a Russian contemporary artist. He is known for his controversial political art performances, which he calls "events of Subject-Object Art" (previously "events of political art"). His work often involves nudity and self-mutilation. Pavlensky makes the "mechanics of power" visible, forcing authorities to take part in his events by staging them in areas with heavy police surveillance. By doing so, "the criminal case becomes one of the layers of the artwork" and the government is "[drawn] into the process of making art".

Early life and education 
Born in Leningrad in 1984, Pavlensky studied monumental art at the Saint Petersburg Art and Industry Academy. During his fourth year in the Academy, he took additional training at St. Petersburg Pro Arte Foundation for Culture and Arts (:ru:Про Арте).

Pavlensky's "events" are inspired in part by Pussy Riot, as demonstrated in Seam, and follow in the tradition of artists such as Chris Burden, the Viennese Actionists, and Moscow Actionists Oleg Kulik and Alexander Brener, Fluxus and Joseph Beuys.

Career 
Pavlensky and Oksana Shalygina founded an independent online newspaper Political Propaganda in 2012, which was dedicated to contemporary art in political contexts, "overcoming cultural chauvinism, implemented by the government", feminism and gender equality.

Seam (2012) 
Pavlensky first became known for sewing his mouth shut in political art event against the incarceration of members of the Russian punk group Pussy Riot. On 23 July 2012 Pavlensky appeared at Kazan Cathedral, St. Petersburg with his lips sewn shut, holding a banner that stated, "Action of Pussy Riot was a replica of the famous action of Jesus Christ (Matthew 21:12–13)". Police called an ambulance and sent him for a psychiatric examination; the psychiatrist declared him sane and released him shortly after the incident. The artist stated that he was highlighting the lack of regard for artists in contemporary Russia, saying: "My intention was not to surprise anyone or come up with something unusual. Rather, I felt I had to make a gesture that would accurately reflect my situation".

Seam is said to reference David Wojnarowicz's actions in Rosa von Praunheim's documentary Silence = Death (1990), in which Wojnarowicz had sewn his own lips shut in protest of the Reagan administration's lack of action against the AIDS epidemic.

On 14 November 2012 Reuters published its list of the 98 best photos of the year which included Seam.

Carcass (2013) 
On 3 May 2013 Pavlensky held a political art event in which he wanted to show the existence of a person inside a repressive legal system. This event was called Carcass. His assistants brought him naked, wrapped in a multilayered cocoon of barbed wire, to the main entrance of the Legislative Assembly of Saint Petersburg.<ref name="VideoOfAction">''Petr Pavlensky // Escapist. – 2013. – July, 10.</ref>Own korr. Activists explained of the naked man action near the Legislative Assembly building // www.mr7.ru. – 2013. – May, 3. The artist remained silent, lying still in a half-bent position inside the cocoon, and did not react to the actions of others until he was released by the police with the help of garden clippers. This performance was awarded the Alternative Prize for Russian Activist Art in the category Actions Implemented in Urban Space in 2013.

Pavlensky made the following comment about his art work:
A series of laws aimed at suppressing civic activism, intimidation of the population, steadily growing number of political prisoners, the laws against NGOs, the 18+ laws, censorship laws, activity of Federal Service for Supervision of Communications, Information Technology and Mass Media, "promotion of homosexuality" laws  – all these laws aren't aimed against criminals, but against the people. And at last the Blasphemy law. That is why I organized this action. The human body is naked like a carcass, there is nothing on it except the barbed wire, which by the way was invented for the protection of livestock. These laws like the wire, keep people in individual pens: all this persecution of political activists, "prisoners of May, 6", governmental repressions is the metaphor of the pen with the barbed wire around it. All this has been done in order to turn people into gutless and securely guarded cattle, which can only consume, work, and reproduce.: Dmitry Volchek, "Cultural Diary: On Good Friday», Radio Liberty, 8 May 2013

Fixation (2013)
On 10 November 2013, while sitting naked on the stone pavement in front of Lenin's Mausoleum on the Red Square, Moscow, Pavlensky hammered a large nail through his scrotum, affixing it to the stone pavement. His political art event coincided with the annual Russian Police Day. When the police arrived, they covered him with a blanket and later arrested him.

"A naked artist, looking at his testicles nailed to the cobblestone is a metaphor of apathy, political indifference, and fatalism of Russian society," declared Pavlensky in his statement to the media.

Freedom (2014)
On 23 February 2014 Pavlensky organized an event called Freedom inspired by Maidan and the 2014 Ukrainian revolution. The artist and his friends built an imitation barricade on Tripartite Bridge in Saint Petersburg, burned tires, and beat drums. The event was interrupted by Saint Petersburg police who arrested Pavlensky and his colleagues.

On 25 February 2014 Dzerzhinsky Criminal Court stopped the administrative case against Pavlensky on the accusations of hooliganism, and released him from custody. An investigation into Pavlensky's alleged violation of the regulations on political meetings continued. He was charged with vandalism due to the tire burning. During the investigation, Pavlensky secretly recorded his interrogation sessions with Pavel Yasman, the main investigating officer, and involved him into a discussion on the nature and meanings of political art. Yasman then quit his job at Russia’s Investigative Committee and began preparing to become a lawyer in order to defend Pavlensky. The transcript of the conversations was published as the Dialogues on art in several countries.

Segregation (2014)

On 19 October 2014 Pavlensky cut off his earlobe with a chef's knife while sitting naked on the roof of the infamous Serbsky Center to make visible political abuse of psychiatry in Russia. This art event was an homage to Van Gogh.

Threat (2015)
Pavlensky came to the first entrance of the Lubyanka Building, which is the headquarters of the Russian Federal Security Service, on 9 November 2015 at 1:15 a.m. Moscow time, doused the front door with gasoline, and set fire to it with a cigarette lighter. The doors of the building were partially burnt. Pavlensky stood and waited to be arrested, was detained after 30 seconds without resistance, and was charged with debauchery. A few hours after the event, a video appeared on the Internet with an explanation of the meaning of the burning.

The criminal case against Pavlensky was opened on 9 November 2015 under the "vandalism" section of Article 214 of the Russian criminal code. He was held in a psychiatric ward for a few weeks, and spent seven months in prison waiting for his trial.

According to gallerist Marat Gelman, the action shows Pavlensky's "obvious symbolism". "The Lubyanka door is the gate of hell, the entrance into the world of absolute evil. And against the backdrop of hellfire is a lonely artist, waiting to be captured ... Pavlensky's figure at the door of the FSB in flames - very important symbol for today's Russia, both political and artistic."

On 8 June 2016, the Moscow criminal court declared Pavlensky guilty of vandalism and sentenced him to a fine of 500,000 rubles, which Pavlensky refused to pay.

On 13 August 2016, Pavlensky gave a lecture in Odessa, Ukraine which ended with the inebriated Ukrainian journalist and screenwriter Vladimir Nestrenko instigating a fight that ended with his stabbing one of two security guards who tried to subdue him. The second of the two security guards suffered a fatal heart attack after the incident.

Lighting (2017)
On 16 October 2017, in his first political art event outside of Russia, Pavlensky was arrested in Paris after setting fire to the street-level windows of an office of the Bank of France, located on the Place de la Bastille in Paris. He was charged with property damage, together with his accomplice Oksana Shalygina. He was initially detained in a psychiatric unit, until a judge ordered him to be placed in pretrial detention at Fleury-Mérogis Prison. Pavlensky went on two dry hunger strikes while imprisoned in protest at “lack of transparency” over legal process. He served eleven months in pretrial detention.

On 10 January 2019, Pavlensky was sentenced to three years in prison; his pre-trial detention was counted as time served and the remaining two years were suspended. Shalygina was sentenced to two years in prison, of which 16 months were spent on probation. In addition, the convicts are obliged to pay the Bank of France €18,678 as compensation for material damage and €3,000 for moral damage. According to the newspaper Le Matin, Pavlensky in response shouted in Russian "Never!". Pavlensky dedicated his trial to the Marquis de Sade.

 Pornopolitics (2020) 

In 2020, Pavlensky innovated with a new political art event called "Pornopolitics" for which he launched a website presented as "the first political porn platform". This action aims to expose the lies of civil servants, politicians, representatives of power who "impose puritanism on society while despising it".

On February 12, the artist published intimate videos and sexually connoted messages sent by the deputy and Paris mayoral candidate Benjamin Griveaux to a woman. Pavlensky explained that this material demonstrates "the hypocrisy" of the candidate who campaigned by putting forward "traditional family values". Benjamin Griveaux then withdrew from the mayoral elections. Pornopolitique.com was taken offline three days after the event.

Pavlensky was arrested and placed in police custody with his partner Alexandra de Taddeo who was the recipient of the sexually explicit content.

 Group art exhibitions 
In 2012, Pavlensky participated in the alumni and students art exhibition Oculus Two organized by the Pro Arte Foundation.

In 2013, in front of the State Hermitage Museum in Saint Petersburg, he organized a street art exhibition titled Ghosts of Identity, which came as a project of his Political Propaganda periodical.

In 2017, Pavlensky participated in Art Riot at the Saatchi Gallery in London. This exhibition ranks among the top 10 of most popular contemporary art exhibitions of the year.

In 2017, he also participates in Beyond the pleasure principle at Zachęta National Gallery of Art.

In 2018, his work is exposed as part of the exhibition Us or Chaos at BPS22 and Talking about a revolution at 22Visconti.

In 2018, Pack gallery presents his work as part of the exhibition 439754, his prison number at Fleury-Mérogis Prison, where he is detained.

In 2019, ART4.RU Contemporary Art Museum exposes the Archives of Pyotr Pavlensky.

In 2022, his works are exhibited as part of the Politics in Art exhibition at MOCAK in Krakow. The decision to use his work Seam as promotional material for the exhibition was highly criticized by activists who demanded the work to be replaced by that of a Ukrainian artist. A petition signed by more than a hundred Ukrainian and Polish artists led the director of MOCAK, Maria Anna Potocka, to publicly defend her choice: "When we selected the works for the exhibition, we were looking for artists who express themselves on political matters and, at the same time, whose works have great artistic value”.

In 2022, Pavlensky presents Pornopolitics and Other Precedents, his first solo show in the UK. The exhibition, held at the London-based organisation a/political, is backed by Babestation. This exhibition of "precedents" unveils Pavlensky's theoretical framework, which he terms Subject-Object Art.

 Controversies 
 Sexual assault allegations 
In the beginning of 2017, Pavlensky received asylum in France, after he fled Russia with his partner Oksana Shalygina and their children amid allegations of sexual assault against the couple. Media in Russia reported that a young actress from Moscow theatre Teatr.doc, Anastasia Slonina, had accused Pavlensky and Shalygina of sexually assaulting her and then threatening her. Pavlensky and Shalygina denied the allegations and said the investigation was politically motivated; similarities have been noted with the accusations against Russian historian Yury A. Dmitriev. The couple moved from Russia to France in response. In 2017, they were granted political asylum in France.

 Invasion of privacy 

In February 2020, Benjamin Griveaux, a former government minister, lodged a legal complaint following the release of videos of him performing a sex act on himself. Petr Pavlensky and his girlfriend are suspected of invasion of privacy and “broadcasting images of a sexual nature without the permission of the person involved”. Pavlensky allegedly admitted to releasing the video on his website, saying he wanted to expose the minister's “hypocrisy”. Pavlenski was arrested on 14 February 2020 for stabbing two people in a Paris flat during a New Year's Eve party. The police were looking for him since then.

Intimate partner violence allegation
In November 2020 Pavlensky’s ex-partner Oksana Shalygina released a book and gave an interview to the website Wonderzine. She recounted experiencing severe physical abuse and sexual violence from Pavlensky. Pavlensky's partner, Alexandra De Taddeo, declared that she read those allegations "with utter bewilderment... Pyotr never showed disrespect to his ex-girlfriend and never even said a bad word about her" and that, in her own experience, "Pavlensky never ever resorted to violence".

In 2022, Pavlensky declared that Shalygina's "book was built on lies, interpretations and understatements... But I do not want to comment on this situation in more detail, so as not to violate the author's intention of Shalygina".

 Awards 
He was awarded the Václav Havel Prize for Creative Dissent in 2016. The Prize was later withdrawn after Pavlensky announced his intention to dedicate it (and its monetary award) to an insurgent group and then explicitly endorsed the use of violence as a valid method to combat government oppression.

Pavlensky was also nominated for Russia's "Innovation" art prize in 2016, but was later barred by the National Centre for Contemporary Art on the grounds that he had broken the law, prompting four members of the jury to leave in protest.

 Bibliography 

 Павленский П. А. О русском акционизме / Пётр Павленский. — М.: АСТ, 2016. — 288 с. — (Ангедония. Проект Данишевского). — 
 Pjotr Pawlenski. Pjotr Pawlenski Aktionen / Pjotr Pawlenski. — B.: CiconiaXCiconia, 2016. — ISBN 
 Pawlenski P.A. Pjotr Pawlenski: Der bürokratische Krampf und die neue Ökonomie politischer Kunst / Pjotr Pawlenski. — B.: Merve, 2016. — 127 с. — 
 Pawlenski P.A.Wladimir Velminski. Gefängnis des Alltäglichen / Pjotr Pawlenski, Wladimir Velminski. — B.: Matthis & Seitz, 2016. — 135 с. — 
 Pawlenski P.A. PAWLENSKI / Piotr Pawlenski. — W.: Krytyka Polityczna, 2016. — 291 с. — 
 Pavlenski P.A. Théorème  / Piotr Pavlenski, Mariel Primois-Bizot. — P.: Editions Exils, 2020. — 180 с. —  
 Павленский П. А. Столкновение. — Городец, 2021. — 272 c. — 
 Piotr Pavlenski. Collision. — Au Diable Vauvert, 2022. — 336 c. — 

 Translations 

 Pavlenski P.A. LE CAS PAVLENSKI/ La politique comme art / Piotr Pavlenski. — P.: Louison editions, 2016. — 262 с. —  (French)
 Pëtr Pavlenskij. Nudo con filo spinato - ilSaggiatore, 2019 -  (Italian)

Copy cat performance
On 5 November 2020, outside of the Federal Security Service (FSB) Pavel Krisevich "replicated the crucifixion of Jesus Christ while other activists in raincoats labeled “FSB” doused the surrounding area with a harmless burning liquid and scattered folders signifying criminal cases".

 References 

 External links 
 Political Propaganda, online magazine, in Russian.
 Video of the action  Carcass TV Channel Rain, 5 March 2013, in Russian.
 One hour broadcast They with Petr Pavlensky TV Channel, Echo of Moscow, in Russian.
 D. Zykov. Video of action Nail. Artist Petr Pavlensky nailed his testicles to the cobblestone of Red Square'', Grani.ru, 11 October 2013.
 Severed earlobe is merely latest scandalous art stunt by Pyotr Pavlensky, Russia Beyond the Headlines
 Jan Machonin Too Creative Dissident online magazine A2 16/ 2016

1984 births
Living people
Artists from Saint Petersburg
Russian performance artists
Russian contemporary artists
Political artists
Prisoners and detainees of Russia
Russian prisoners and detainees
Riots and civil disorder in Russia